Risto Mätas (born 30 April 1984) is a retired Estonian track and field athlete who competed in the javelin throw. His personal best throw is 83.48 m, achieved in August 2013 in Kohila.

Achievements

Seasonal bests by year
2005 – 79.68
2006 – 80.53
2007 – 77.29
2008 – 79.38
2009 – 73.56
2011 – 81.56
2012 – 82.10
2013 –  83.48
2014 – 80.73
2015 – 82.06
2016 – 83.09

References

1984 births
Living people
People from Viljandi Parish
Estonian male javelin throwers
Athletes (track and field) at the 2012 Summer Olympics
Athletes (track and field) at the 2016 Summer Olympics
Olympic athletes of Estonia
World Athletics Championships athletes for Estonia